Guillermo Osvaldo Marro (born 1 July 1983) is an Argentine Paralympic swimmer who competes in international elite events. He specialises in backstroke swimming. He is a triple Paralympic medalist, double World medalist and a triple Parapan American Games champion. He is highly regarded as Argentina's most successful Paralympic swimmer.

In 2014, Marro became the first Argentine Paralympic swimmer to cross the English Channel, he completed the swimming course in over fourteen hours. He swam as part of a team with Scott Patterson and Pedro Rangel who were double leg amputees, Moises Fuentes who is a paraplegic and Enrique Guerrero who has a below the knee amputation.

References

1983 births
Living people
People from Pergamino
Paralympic swimmers of Argentina
Argentine male backstroke swimmers
English Channel swimmers
Swimmers at the 2000 Summer Paralympics
Swimmers at the 2004 Summer Paralympics
Swimmers at the 2008 Summer Paralympics
Swimmers at the 2012 Summer Paralympics
Swimmers at the 2016 Summer Paralympics
Medalists at the 2000 Summer Paralympics
Medalists at the 2004 Summer Paralympics
Medalists at the 2008 Summer Paralympics
Medalists at the World Para Swimming Championships
Medalists at the 2003 Parapan American Games
Medalists at the 2011 Parapan American Games
Medalists at the 2015 Parapan American Games
S7-classified Paralympic swimmers
Sportspeople from Buenos Aires Province